Boulder Mountain (also known as Bluebell Knoll and Boulder Top) in Utah, USA makes up half of the Aquarius Plateau of South Central Utah in Wayne and Garfield counties. The mountain rises to the west of Capitol Reef National Park and consists of steep slopes and cliffs with over 50,000 acres (200 km²) of rolling forest and meadowlands on the top. The mountain has a nearly flat summit of roughly 70 square miles. The mountain is the highest timbered plateau in North America and is part of the Dixie National Forest.

Highway 12 

Utah Scenic Byway 12 traverses the eastern side of the mountain from Torrey through Boulder and on to Escalante. A series of unpaved backcountry roads and jeep trails provide access to the top during the brief snow-free time, usually only a few months from July to September. These jeep trails were originally created as the main route for wagons traveling between Escalante and Boulder. The trail was upgraded to a road in 1920 when the Ohio Drilling Company created a route to Wagon Box Mesa. A famous road on the mountain, Hell's Backbone Road, forks from Scenic Byway 12. Hell's Backbone then runs west toward Posey Lake/Pine Creek Road. The road eventually winds back to the town of Escalante, which allows travelers to complete a 38-mile loop.

Fly fishing 

Boulder Mountain is routinely held in high regard by Utahan's as a fisherman's paradise. Fishing opportunities began on the mountain in the 1950s when juvenile fish(fry) were carried via horseback and planted in the area's high alpine lakes and streams. In 1971, the state record brook trout (7 pounds, 8 ounces) was caught in Boulder Mountain's waters. Brook trout are the prominent species stocked on Boulder Mountain. Colorado River Cutthroat are the fish species native to the area. In 2014, a committee consisting of anglers and residents convened to determine the future management of the fisheries on Boulder Mountain.  This committee assisted the Utah Division of Wildlife Resources in resolving the issue of overpopulating brook trout in the alpine lakes of Boulder Mountain. Based on the discussion, 35 percent of the lakes would be managed for trophy brook trout. The management plan categorized each lake into ten different sections: North Creek, North Slope, South Slope, East Slope, West Slope, Boulder Top, Griffin Top, and Escalante Mountain. The management plan introduces splake, tiger, and cutthroat trout to the waters that the committee deemed appropriate. Colorado cutthroat populations have steadily decreased since the introduction of brook trout to the area. Emphasizing the importance of re-establishing a healthy population of native trout in the area, sterile brook trout (triploid) and other sterile trout species, such as tiger and splake trout, were introduced to increase fishing opportunities.

Flora 

The Boulder Mountain cinquefoil (Potentilla angelliae) is a rare species of plant that is endemic to Boulder Mountain. Acharophyte assemblage located at the Griffin Top section (Aquarius Plateau, Utah, USA) provides, for the first time, the relative age of the base of the Claron Formation.

Fauna 

The mountain is home to some of the biggest elk in the state of Utah, consistently producing some of the largest bull elk during the hunt each fall. The mountain is also known for mule deer. Predators are also prevalent; mountain lions and black bears are commonly seen throughout the area.

In popular culture 

The Scottish dream pop band Cocteau Twins named their fifth album Blue Bell Knoll after the mountain.

See also
Thousand Lake Mountain

References

External links

 

Mountains of Utah
Mountains of Wayne County, Utah
Mountains of Garfield County, Utah
Colorado Plateau